The High Road is a lost 1915 silent film drama starring Valli Valli and directed by John W. Noble. It was produced by Rolfe Photoplays and distributed through Metro Pictures. The film was based on a 1912 play by Edward Sheldon and starred Mrs. Fiske.

Cast
Valli Valli - Mary Page
Frank Elliott - Allen Wilson
C. H. Brenon - Barnes
Fred L. Wilson -

References

External links
The High Road at IMDb.com
film herald(ha,heritage auction)

1915 films
Lost American films
American silent feature films
American black-and-white films
Films directed by John W. Noble
Silent American drama films
1915 drama films
1915 lost films
Lost drama films
1910s American films